The Manantial roundnose minnow (Dionda argentosa) is a species of ray-finned fish in the family Cyprinidae.
It is endemic to the Devils River and San Felipe Creek in Texas.

It is threatened by habitat loss.

References

Dionda
Freshwater fish of the United States
Fish described in 1856
Taxa named by Charles Frédéric Girard